The USRA Heavy Mountain was a USRA standard class of steam locomotive designed under the control of the United States Railroad Administration, the nationalized railroad system in the United States during World War I.  This was the standard light freight locomotive of the USRA types, and was of 4-8-2 wheel arrangement in the Whyte notation, or 2′D1′ in UIC classification.

A total of 15 locomotives were built under the auspices of the USRA.

Neither the originals built by the USRA or any of the subsequent copies were preserved, being scrapped between 1940 and 1959.

References

USRA locomotives
4-8-2 locomotives
Standard gauge locomotives of the United States
Railway locomotives introduced in 1918